Quiero ser (I want to be...) is a 2000 Mexican-German short drama film directed by Florian Gallenberger. It won an Oscar in 2001 for Best Short Subject.

Cast
 Emilio Perez as Juan, as a boy
 Fernando Pena Cuevas as Jorge, as a boy (as Fernando Peña)
 Chaco as Chaco
 Mario Zaragoza as Juan
 Luis Escutia as Jorge
 Maricela Olguin as Eismädchen / Icegirl
 Memo Gil as Ballonhändler / Balloonseller
 Martina as Kellnerin / Waiter
 Ariceli Godinez as Hähnchenverkäuferin / Chicken seller
 Julio Coiman as Hausmeister / Caretaker

References

External links

2000 films
2000 drama films
2000 short films
2000s Spanish-language films
Mexican short films
Mexican independent films
German drama short films
German independent films
Films set in Mexico City
Films shot in Mexico City
Live Action Short Film Academy Award winners
Student films
2000s German films
2000s Mexican films